Felix Salten (6 September 1869 – 8 October 1945) was an Austro-Hungarian author and literary critic in Vienna.

Life and death
Salten was born Siegmund Salzmann on 6 September 1869 in Pest, Austria-Hungary. His father was Fülöp Salzmann, the telegraph office's clerk in Pest; his mother was Maria Singer. He was the grandson of an Orthodox rabbi. When he was four weeks old, his family relocated to Vienna, as many Jews did after the Imperial government had granted full citizenship rights to Jews in 1867.

When his father went bankrupt, the sixteen-year-old Salten quit school and began working for an insurance agency. He also began submitting poems and book reviews to journals. He became part of the "Young Vienna" movement (Jung-Wien) and soon received work as a full-time art and theater critic for Vienna's press (Wiener Allgemeine Zeitung, Zeit). In 1900, he published his first collection of short stories. In 1901, he initiated Vienna's first, short-lived literary cabaret Jung-Wiener Theater Zum lieben Augustin.

He was soon publishing, on an average, one book a year, of plays, short stories, novels, travel books, and essay collections. He also wrote for nearly all the major newspapers of Vienna. In 1906, Salten went to Ullstein as an editor in chief of the B.Z. am Mittag and the Berliner Morgenpost, but relocated to Vienna some months later. He wrote also film scripts and librettos for operettas. In 1927 he became president of the Austrian P.E.N. club as successor of Arthur Schnitzler.

His best remembered work is Bambi (1923). It was intended by Salten as a parable of the dangers and persecution faced by Jews in Europe. A translation in English was published by Simon & Schuster in 1928, and became a Book-of-the-Month Club success. In 1933, he sold the film rights to the American director Sidney Franklin for only $1,000, and Franklin later transferred the rights to the Walt Disney Studios, which formed the basis of the animated film Bambi (1942).

Life in Austria became perilous for Jews during the 1930s. In Germany, Adolf Hitler had Salten's books banned in 1936. Two years later, after Germany's annexation of Austria, Salten moved to Zurich, Switzerland, with his wife, and spent his final years there. Felix Salten died on 8 October 1945, at the age of 76. He is buried at Israelitischer Friedhof Unterer Friesenberg.

Salten married actress Ottilie Metzl (1868–1942) in 1902, and had two children: Paul (1903–1937) and Anna Katharina (1904–1977), who married Swiss actor Hans Rehmann. He composed another book based on the character of Bambi, titled Bambi’s Children: The Story of a Forest Family (1939). His stories Perri and The Hound of Florence inspired the Disney films Perri (1957) and The Shaggy Dog (1959), respectively.

Salten was himself an avid hunter. 

Salten is now considered the probable author of a successful erotic novel, Josephine Mutzenbacher: The Life Story of a Viennese Whore, as Told by Herself published anonymously in 1906, filled with social criticism.

Selected works

 1899 – Der Gemeine
 1906 – Josephine Mutzenbacher, authorship assumed – in German: Josefine Mutzenbacher oder Die Geschichte einer Wienerischen Dirne von ihr selbst erzählt (Vienna: Privatdruck [Fritz Freund], 1906)
 1907 – Herr Wenzel auf Rehberg und sein Knecht Kaspar Dinckel
 1910 – Olga Frohgemuth
 1911 – Der Wurstelprater
 1922 – Das Burgtheater
 1923 – Der Hund von Florenz; English translation by Huntley Paterson, illustrated by Kurt Wiese, The Hound of Florence (Simon & Schuster, 1930), 
 1923 – Bambi: Eine Lebensgeschichte aus dem Walde; English transl. Whittaker Chambers, illus. Kurt Wiese, foreword John Galsworthy, as Bambi, a Life in the Woods (US: Simon & Schuster, 1928, ; UK: Jonathan Cape, June/July 1928); re-illustrated by Barbara Cooney (S&S, 1970), 
 1925 – Neue Menschen auf alter Erde: Eine Palästinafahrt
 1927 – Martin Overbeck: Der Roman eines reichen jungen Mannes
 1929 – Fünfzehn Hasen: Schicksale in Wald und Feld; English transl. Whittaker Chambers, as Fifteen Rabbits (US: Simon & Schuster, 1930); revised and enlarged (New York : Grosset & Dunlap, 1942, illus. Kurt Wiese))
1931 – Freunde aus aller Welt: Roman eines zoologischen Gartens; English transl. Whittaker Chambers, illus. Kurt Wiese, as The City Jungle (US: Simon & Schuster, 1932)
 1931 – Fünf Minuten Amerika
 1933 – Florian: Das Pferd des Kaisers; transl. Erich Posselt and Michel Kraike, Florian: The Emperor’s Stallion (Bobbs-Merrill, 1934), 
 1938 – Perri; German, Die Jugend des Eichhörnchens Perri
 1939 – Bambi's Children, English translation (Bobbs-Merrill); German original, Bambis Kinder: Eine Familie im Walde (1940)
 1940 – Renni the Rescuer
 1942 – A Forest World
 1945 – Djibi, the Kitten, illus. Walter Linsenmaier; U.S. transl., Jibby the Cat (Messner, 1948)

Selected filmography
 Doctor Schotte (1918)
 Modern Marriages (1924)
 Comedians (1925)
 Storm in a Water Glass (1931)
 Poor as a Church Mouse (1931)
 Scampolo (1932)
 The Empress and I (1933)
 The Only Girl (1933)
 Florian (1940)
 Bambi (1942)
 Perri (1957)
 The Shaggy Dog (1959)

See also
Exilliteratur
Fable
Salzmann

References

Sources
 Eddy, Beverley Driver: Felix Salten: Man of Many Faces. Riverside (Ca.): Ariadne Press, 2010. .
 Seibert, Ernst & Blumesberger, Susanne (eds.): Felix Salten – der unbekannte Bekannte. Wien 2006. .

External links
 
 
 
 
 
 
 Felix Salten: A Preliminary Bibliography of His Works in Translation.

1869 births
1945 deaths
20th-century Austrian dramatists and playwrights
20th-century Austrian male writers
20th-century Austrian novelists
20th-century Austrian screenwriters
20th-century German dramatists and playwrights
20th-century German male writers
20th-century pseudonymous writers
Austrian children's writers
Austrian literary critics
Austrian male dramatists and playwrights
Austrian male novelists
Austrian Zionists
Austro-Hungarian Jews
Austro-Hungarian writers
Exilliteratur writers
German male dramatists and playwrights
German male novelists
Hungarian refugees
Jewish emigrants from Austria after the Anschluss
Jewish novelists
Swiss people of Austrian descent
Writers from Budapest
Young Vienna